Dol is a village in Croatia, close to the town of Postira on the island Brač. It has a population of 130.

References 

Brač
Populated places in Split-Dalmatia County